Arapović is a mainly Croatian surname, but is also found among Bosniaks in lesser numbers. People with the name include:
Borislav Arapović (born 1935), Bosnian-Croatian poet, linguist and literary scholar 
Faris Arapović (1970-2019), Bosnian drummer, member of Zabranjeno Pušenje and Sikter 
Franjo Arapović (born 1965), Croatian basketball player
Husnija Arapović (born 1944), Bosnian-Herzegovinian footballer 
Krešimir Arapović (1924–1994), Croatian footballer
Marko Arapović (born 1996), Croatian basketball player 
 (born 1940), Croatian poet

References

Croatian surnames
Bosnian surnames